The following is a list of current franchised bus routes in Hong Kong, sorted according to bus companies. All current franchised bus routes are operated by air-conditioned buses only and fares are paid through flat fares. Note that Hong Kong Island, Kowloon and New Territories and Lantau Island have their own, separate route numbering systems.

Hong Kong Island

Kowloon, New Kowloon and New Territories routes

Kowloon Motor Bus

Kowloon and New Kowloon routes

New Territories routes

New World First Bus and Citybus routes

MTR East Rail line Feeder Bus routes

MTR Bus (Northwest New Territories)
These routes are not franchised routes, but the areas served by the LRT are a franchised area of the KCR Corporation / MTR Corporation Limited, and other bus companies were not allowed to run similar local routes in the northwestern New Territories until this restriction was lifted in 2006.

Cross Harbour routes
All cross harbour routes have 3 digit route numbers. Routes travelling through the Cross-Harbour Tunnel begin with a "10" or "11", and are shaded red. Routes travelling through the Eastern Harbour Tunnel begin with a "6", and are shaded red. Western Harbour Tunnel Routes begin with a "9", and are shaded green.

Most routes that begin with a "3" are morning express routes, with the exception of route 307.

Cross-Harbour Tunnel

Eastern Harbour Crossing

Western Harbour Crossing

North Lantau routes
These routes serve Northern Lantau Island, namely Tung Chung, Disneyland, Airport, AsiaWorld–Expo and Hong Kong–Zhuhai–Macau Bridge. Most of them link Lantau with Kowloon and Hong Kong Island. Routes are divided into Airport Bus Routes (with a prefix "A"), Late Night Airport Bus Routes (with a prefix "NA"), North Lantau External Routes (with a prefix "E"), North Lantau External Night Bus Routes (with a prefix "N"), Disneyland Routes (with a prefix "R"), Shuttle Routes (with a prefix "S") and AsiaWorld–Expo Special Routes (with a prefix "X").

All North Lantau routes are either served by Citybus (CTB) or Long Win Bus (LWB).

Airport Buses

External Routes (including Night Buses)

Disneyland routes

Shuttle routes

AsiaWorld–Expo special services
These routes only depart for the AsiaWorld–Expo before large-scale events start, or return to the urban areas after large-scale events have ended.

Lantau Island routes
Bus routes that link different parts of Lantau are operated by the New Lantao Bus Company.

Note that the service types "North-South Lantau" or "South Lantau" have different fare between weekdays and holidays, and routes labelled chartered service are only available to pre-booked packaged tours.

Cross-Border routes 
These routes travel to border checkpoints at Lok Ma Chau station, Shenzhen Bay Port, Hong Kong–Zhuhai–Macau Bridge and Heung Yuen Wai Port.

Park Island routes 
These are non-franchised routes travelling to the private housing estate of Park Island and Ma Wan

Discovery Bay routes 
These are non-franchised routes serving Discovery Bay and linking the area to other areas on Lantau Island.

See also
Hong Kong bus route numbering
Transport in Hong Kong

References 

 
Hong Kong transport-related lists
Hong